Proseriphus viridis is a species of beetle in the family Cerambycidae, the only species in the genus Proseriphus.

References

Acanthocinini
Beetles described in 1864
Monotypic beetle genera